Smithson–McCall Farm is a  historic district in Bethesda, Tennessee. The farm was listed under the National Register of Historic Places in 2007.  The listing claims that the property "documents the impact of the progressive agricultural movement of the early twentieth century on the operations and landscape of a middle-class family farm," and includes an "architecturally significant group of buildings and structures, placed within an agricultural landscape of high integrity...that represents a good example of farmstead architecture in Middle Tennessee and that reflects the impact of the Progressive Farm movement of the early twentieth century".

The property has also been known as Smithson-Fisher Farm, Happy Hills Farm, WM. 1043, Fisher Farm, and Bag End Farm throughout its history.

The farmhouse was constructed c. 1830 and changed significantly c. 1860 and c. 1920.  Additional farm structures were added during c.1920-c.1940, including a dairy barn, a dairy silo, a well house, a burley tobacco barn, a water trough, a garage, a smokehouse and a chicken coop.  The property includes four ponds.  It includes Colonial Revival and "Hall and parlor" architecture and other styles.  When listed, the district included seven contributing buildings, six contributing structures,  and one contributing site.

The listing is described in its NRHP nomination document.

The property was covered in a study of Historic Family Farms in Middle Tennessee MPS.

As "Fisher Farm", it is listed as a Tennessee Century Farm.  It continues as a working farm, raising sheep.

References

Additional sources
 
 
 

Farmhouses in the United States
Houses in Williamson County, Tennessee
Houses completed in 1830
Farms on the National Register of Historic Places in Tennessee
Historic districts on the National Register of Historic Places in Tennessee
Houses on the National Register of Historic Places in Tennessee
National Register of Historic Places in Williamson County, Tennessee
1830 establishments in Tennessee
Century farms
Colonial Revival architecture in Tennessee